Western Australian Government Astronomer is a position created by the Government of Western Australia in 1896.

The first Western Australian Government Astronomer was William Ernest Cooke, who was appointed in 1896. The Perth Observatory became the base for the Western Australia Government Astronomer on completion of the new building in October 1897.On arrival in Perth, his first task was to determine the exact latitude and longitude of the colony.  He was also able to determine the time of day with greater accuracy.  Before his arrival clocks could vary by up to half an hour.

The title of 'Government Astronomer' was replaced with the title 'Director' by the WA Government when Mr. M.D. P Candy became the first Director of the Perth Observatory. The title of Government Astronomer was no longer used as being the head of the Perth Observatory.
 
As of 14 March 2013, the Government Astronomer position ceased to exist at the Perth Observatory.

History
The idea of an observatory for Perth was first introduced by  Premier John Forrest in 1891, but failed to obtain financial backing. Funding was finally approved in 1895, along with funds to build the Perth Mint) as well as the Western Australian Museum and Art Gallery.

Forrest asked the Government Astronomer of South Australia, Sir Charles Todd for advice on an observatory. Todd sent specifications for instruments and plans for buildings, based on the Adelaide Observatory and recommended his own Assistant Astronomer, Mr. W.E. Coookie, for the position of Government Astronomer and Meteorologist.

Cooke came to Western Australia to take up his post as the first Government Astronomer for the State in February 1896. The Observatory would not be completed until 1897.

Western Australia Government Astronomers
 1896–1912 – William Ernest Cooke – Government Astronomer
 1912–1920 – Harold Burnam Curlewis – Acting Government Astronomer
 1920–1940 – Harold Burnam Curlewis – Government Astronomer
 1940–1962 – Hyman Solomon Spigl – Government Astronomer 
 1962–1974 – Bertrand John Harris – Government Astronomer
 1974–1979 – Dr. Iwan (Ivan) Nikoloff – Acting Government Astronomer
 1979–1984 – Dr. Iwan (Ivan) Nikoloff – Government Astronomer
 1984–1993 – Mr. Michael Phillip Candy – Director 
 1994–2010 – Dr. James D. Biggs – Director 
 2010–2013 – Dr. Ralph Martin – Acting Director

See also
 Perth Observatory
 Marking the Western Australia border on the ground

Notes

External links
 The Perth Observatory Website 
 PERTH OBSERVATORY HISTORY (Compiled by Wayne Moredoundt, Historian, from Heritage Council documentation for Perth Observatory heritage listing)
 Lumen The University of Adelaide Alumni Magazine Article – Lumen Pioneer William, Ernest Cooke (PDF) 

Astronomy in Australia